Siberioceras is an extinct genus of orthocerids of uncertain affinity defined by Zhuravleva (1957). Orthocerids are prehistoric shelled cephalopods included in the mostly orthoconic nautiloid superorder Orthoceratoidea.

References

    Sepkoski -Cephalopoda Sepkoski, J.J. Jr. 2002. A compendium of fossil marine animal genera. D.J. Jablonski & M.L. Foote (eds.). Bulletins of American Paleontology 363: 1–560.

Prehistoric nautiloid genera